Rio Bonito do Iguaçu is a municipality in the state of Paraná in the Southern Region of Brazil.

History 

Rio Bonito means nice river and Iguaçu in Tupi means big water: y (water) and gûasu (big).

See also
List of municipalities in Paraná

References

External links 
 Official Site
 News from Rio Bonito do Iguaçu
 Official News from Rio Bonito do Iguaçu

Municipalities in Paraná